Montanaro is a locational surname of Italian origin, meaning a person from Montanaro, Italy. Notable people with the surname include:

Anna Montanaro (born 1973), German actress
Donato A. Montanaro (born 1962), American businessman
José Montanaro (born 1958), Brazilian volleyball player
Lenore Montanaro (born 1990), American poet
Sabino Augusto Montanaro (1922–2011), Paraguayan politician
Tony Montanaro (1927–2002), American mime artist

See also
Montanaro, Italy

References

Italian-language surnames